USS Nantucket may refer to:

 – was a Passaic-class coastal monitor that served in the Union during the American Civil War.
 - was a series of lightships, including one built in 1907 for the United States Lighthouse Service, and including one National Historic Landmark
 – started off as USS Ranger, then renamed to  before being named Nantucket.  While seeing some action, the majority of her time was spent in repair, before being converted as a survey/school ship.
 – a coastal passenger steamer built in 1899, but found unsuitable for naval service and returned to her owner.
 is a planned

References

United States Navy ship names